Marquet is an occupational surname of French origin, which means a woodworker in marquetry. The name may refer to:

Adrien Marquet (1884–1955), French politician
Albert Marquet (1875–1947), French painter
Andrée Marquet (born 1934), French organic chemist
Charles Marquet (1820–1900), French naturalist and entomologist
Claude Marquet (1869–1920), Australian cartoonist
Élisabeth Marquet (born 1960), French politician
François Marquet (born 1995), Belgian football player
Georges Marquet (1886–1947), Belgian businessman
Jaime Marquet (1710–1782), French architect
Josh Marquet (born 1969), Australian cricket player
Luc Marquet (born 1970), French volleyball player
Mathieu Marquet (born 1994), Mauritian swimmer
Maurice Marquet (born 1954), New Zealand field hockey player
Paul Marquet (born 1969), Australian rugby player 
Sascha Marquet (born 1989), German football player

Other uses
Marquet, a fictional continent in Exandria and the main setting of the Critical Role third campaign

See also
Marquette
Marquardt
Marquee

French-language surnames
Occupational surnames